This is a list of hill figures in Wiltshire.

White horse figures

Military figures

Others

Former figures

See also
Bloemfontein, a city in South Africa where Wiltshire troops are believed to have cut the Bloemontein White Horse around 1900, resulting in "the only Wiltshire white horse, that is not in Wiltshire"
Liddington, a village near Swindon once considered for a white horse.
List of public art in Wiltshire

References

External links

Hill figures in England
Horses in culture
Horses in the United Kingdom
White horses (hill figures) in England